This is a list of schools in the North Queensland region of Queensland, Australia, and includes schools in North West Queensland. The region is centred on the coastal cities of Townsville and Mackay, and the inland city of Mount Isa. It includes the following local government areas:

 Shire of Burdekin
 Charters Towers Region
 Shire of Cloncurry
 Shire of Flinders
 Shire of Hinchinbrook
 Mackay Region
 Shire of Mckinlay
 City of Mount Isa
 Aboriginal Shire of Palm Island
 Shire of Richmond
 City of Townsville
 Whitsunday Region

Prior to 2015, the Queensland education system consisted of primary schools, which accommodated students from kindergarten to Year 7 (ages 5–13), and high schools, which accommodate students from Years 8 to 12 (ages 12–18). However, from 2015, Year 7 became the first year of high school.

State schools

State primary schools

State high schools and colleges

Other state schools 

This includes special schools (schools for disabled children) and schools for specific purposes.

Defunct state schools

Private schools

Catholic primary schools
In Queensland, Catholic primary schools are usually (but not always) linked to a parish. Prior to the 1970s, most schools were founded by religious institutes, but with the decrease in membership of these institutes, together with major reforms inside the church, lay teachers and administrators began to take over the schools, a process which completed by approximately 1990.

Within the region, schools in the Mackay Region are administered by Catholic Education Office, Diocese of Rockhampton, which was established in 1966 and was the first Catholic Education Office (CEO) in Queensland. All others are administered by the Catholic Education Office, Diocese of Townsville. Both are supported by the Queensland Catholic Education Commission, which is responsible for coordinating administration, curriculum and policy across the Catholic school system. Preference for enrolment is given to Catholic students from the parish or local area, although non-Catholic students are admitted if room is available.

Catholic high schools

Independent schools

Defunct private schools

See also
List of schools in Queensland

References

External links
, a directory of Government schools in Queensland. (Department of Education and Training - Queensland Government)
CEO Rockhampton
CEO Townsville
About Independent schools at Independent Schools Queensland.

North Queensland